"Fat Cop" is a song by Australian rock band Regurgitator. The song was released in June 2001 as the lead single from the band's fourth studio album Eduardo and Rodriguez Wage War on T-Wrecks. The single peaked at number 34 in Australia and it ranked at number 27 on Triple J's Hottest 100 in 2001.
 
In 2019, Tyler Jenke from The Brag ranked Regurgitator's best songs, with "Fat Cop" coming it at number 8. Jenke called the song "memorable" calling it "...a rap-rock influenced gem that tells the tale of the titular fat cop."

Track listings

Charts

Release history

References

 

2001 singles
2001 songs
Regurgitator songs
Warner Music Australasia singles